Frascoli is an Italian surname. Notable people with the surname include:

Rodolfo Frascoli, Italian motorcycle designer
Sergio Frascoli (born 1936), Italian footballer

Italian-language surnames